Halani Aulika (born 31 August 1983) is a rugby union prop from Tonga who plays for Top 14 side Grenoble.

Playing career

Provincial Rugby
Born in Tonga, Aulika emigrated to New Zealand in 2000 at the age of 17. After finishing school, he was a fixture in Auckland club rugby for several years but was unable to break into the Auckland provincial side. Short of opportunities in Auckland, he transferred to Otago for the 2010 ITM Cup.

With Otago, Aulika was an instant success and one of the bright lights in a disappointing season for the province.

After serving a 3-match ban for an incident in club rugby, he quickly established himself as one of the side's starting props alongside former All Black Kees Meeuws. In 10 appearances, he scored a team-leading 5 tries and established himself as one of the best attacking props in the competition.

In the 2011 ITM Cup, Aulika appeared in the first 5 matches of the season for Otago before leaving to take up his international duties for Tonga ahead of the 2011 Rugby World Cup.

Super Rugby
Following his successful season with Otago, Aulika earned himself a contract with the Highlanders for the 2011 Super Rugby season. Serving as a depth prop for the squad, he made his only appearance of the season as a substitute in the club's win over the Brumbies on 1 April.

Aviva Premiership
Aulika signed a two-year contract with London Irish in March, 2012 and then later joined the club in July 2012. At the conclusion of the 2015–16 season it was confirmed that Aulika was to leave London Irish and join Sale Sharks the following season.

Top 14
At the end of the 2017–18 English Premiership season, it was announced that Aulika would be moving to French Top 14 side Grenoble.

References

External links
Highlanders Profile
Otago Profile
London Irish Profile

1983 births
Living people
Tongan rugby union players
Tongan emigrants to New Zealand
Otago rugby union players
Highlanders (rugby union) players
Leeds Tykes players
London Irish players
Expatriate rugby union players in England
Tonga international rugby union players
Sale Sharks players
Rugby union props